Mihaela Fera (born 6 August 1970) is a Romanian alpine skier. She competed at the 1988, 1992 and the 1994 Winter Olympics.

References

1970 births
Living people
Romanian female alpine skiers
Olympic alpine skiers of Romania
Alpine skiers at the 1988 Winter Olympics
Alpine skiers at the 1992 Winter Olympics
Alpine skiers at the 1994 Winter Olympics
Sportspeople from Sibiu